Ranitomeya imitator (formerly Dendrobates imitator), is a species of poison dart frog found in the north-central region of eastern Peru. Its common names include mimic poison frog and poison arrow frog, and it is one of the best known dart frogs. It was discovered in the late 1980s by Rainer Schulte who later split it up into more subspecies; describing each as a specific color morph, and sometimes having a separate behavioral pattern. The acoustics, morphs, and behavior of the species have been extensively researched.

Morphology 

A few of the morphs include, but are not limited to, striped, spotted, Varadero, and banded.  The striped morph is the most widely spread, mimicking the striped Ranitomeya variabilis and can be found throughout the lower Huallaga River drainage in Peru. The spotted morph mimics the highland spotted frog Ranitomeya variabilis with mainly blue-green coloration, but can be found in other forms, sometimes in yellow. Although R. imitator closely resembles R. variabilis in coloration with its striped morph, the two species differ in many key aspects. R. imitator provides biparental care and is a monogamous species, while R. variabilis provides solely paternal care and is polygamous. The aradero morph is a lowland form that lives nearby another but does not resemble it. Last, the banded morph, a mimic of Ranitomeya summersi, lives in much drier climates than the average R. imitator and is most often found in Dieffenbachia and Heliconia plants.

Toxicity 
Like most other Ranitomeya species, R. imitator has a mild toxicity compared to other poison dart frogs. It produces the potent pumiliotoxin B, but its small size limits the amount of poison it can secrete. Like other poison dart frogs, it does not produce toxin in captivity. It probably gains its poison from consuming toxic insects or other invertebrates in the wild. Frogs of the related genus Phyllobates may derive their toxins from local melyrid beetles of genus Choresine.

Reproduction and parental care 
[[File:Ranitomeya_imitator_Varadero_-_Mattias_Starkenberg.jpg|Ranitomeya imitator'''s developmental life stages.|thumb|right]]Ranitomeya imitator and related frogs exhibit a degree of parental care, with the female laying feeder eggs for the tadpoles to eat. This frog is the first amphibian species in which the sexual partners have been shown to be monogamous.

 Ownership 
Compared to many other dart frog species, Ranitomeya imitator'' has relatively large and stable wild populations. However, they are often illegally collected and exported. They have also been imported legally, and multiple captive-bred varieties exist in the pet trade.

References

Endemic fauna of Peru
Amphibians of Peru
Poison dart frogs
Amphibians described in 1986
Ranitomeya